Tenaris  is a genus of plant in family Apocynaceae, first described as a genus in 1838. It is native to southern Africa.

Species
 Tenaris browniana S. Moore - Angola
 Tenaris chlorantha Schltr. - South Africa 
 Tenaris filifolia (Schltr.) N.E. Br. - South Africa 
 Tenaris schultzei (Schltr.) E. Phillips -  Kalahari Desert

formerly included
 Tenaris rubella, syn of  Brachystelma rubellum 
 Tenaris simulans,  syn of  Brachystelma rubellum 
 Tenaris subaphylla, syn of  Caralluma edulis

References

Asclepiadoideae
Apocynaceae genera